Vito Rallo (born 30 May 1953) is an Italian prelate of the Catholic Church, who works in the diplomatic service of the Holy See. He has been the Apostolic Nuncio to Morocco since 2015.

Biography 
Vito Rallo was born in Mazara del Vallo, Trapani, on 30 May 1953. He was ordained a priest of the Diocese of Mazara del Vallo on 1 April 1979. He olds a degree in civil and canon law.

In 1986 he entered the Pontifical Ecclesiastical Academy and he joined the diplomatic service of the Holy See on 20 February 1988. His postings took him to Senegal, Mexico, Canada, Lebanon, and Spain.

On 27 January 2004, Pope John Paul II appointed him special envoy and permanent observer of the Holy See to the Council of Europe in Strasbourg, a position he held until 2007.

On 12 June 2007, Pope Benedict XVI appointed him apostolic nuncio to Burkina Faso and Niger and titular archbishop of Alba. On 20 October he received his episcopal consecration in Mazara del Vallo from Cardinal Tarcisio Bertone. He ended his work in those positions in January 2015 "for unexplained health reasons".

On 12 December 2015, Pope Francis appointed him apostolic nuncio to Morocco.

See also
 List of heads of the diplomatic missions of the Holy See

References

External links 
 Catholic Hierarchy: Archbishop Vito Rallo 

Living people
1953 births
People from Trapani
Pontifical Ecclesiastical Academy alumni
Apostolic Nuncios to Burkina Faso
Apostolic Nuncios to Niger
Apostolic Nuncios to Morocco
Permanent Observers of the Holy See to the Council of Europe